North Union School District may refer to:
 North Union Community School District - Iowa
 North Union Local School District - Ohio